Blue Tornado may refer to:

 Blue Tornado (film), 1991 Italian film
 Blue Tornado (roller coaster), at Gardaland
"Blue Tornado", mascot of The McCallie School